The Little Awakino River is a river of North Otago, New Zealand. A tributary of the Waitaki River, it flows into that river a short distance downstream of Lake Waitaki.

See also
 List of rivers of New Zealand

References

Rivers of Otago
Rivers of New Zealand